Thomas Grennan (born 8 June 1995) is an English singer and songwriter from Bedford and is based in London. Grennan found fame as the guest vocalist on Chase & Status's "All Goes Wrong" in 2016. His debut album, Lighting Matches, was released in July 2018. The album peaked at number five on the UK Albums Chart and includes the single "Found What I've Been Looking For".

His second album Evering Road was released in March 2021, beginning his breakthrough in the UK by charting at number one on the UK Albums Chart and including the commercially successful singles "This Is the Place", "Little Bit of Love", "Let's Go Home Together" with Ella Henderson and "Don't Break the Heart". In 2021 and 2022, he was also featured as a guest vocalist on the top-ten singles "By Your Side" with Calvin Harris and "Not Over Yet" with KSI.

Early life and family
Grennan comes from an Irish family. He attended St Thomas More Upper School in Bedford. At the age of 18, he was attacked on the street and was left with four metal plates and screws in his jaw that "still hurt when winter comes". He trained to become a professional footballer, playing for Luton Town for a while, also trying for Northampton Town and Aston Villa; he was later released. Grennan is a supporter of Coventry City. He also worked briefly at Costa Coffee. He told Music Week: "I was close to playing over in the States but something was telling me not to and obviously it was the music".

Grennan's musical beginnings are obscure, but he says he was at a house party where he sang "Seaside" by The Kooks. He did not remember it, but his friends were impressed and pushed him into performing more. He studied acting at St. Mary's University in Twickenham. Aged 18, he started doing gigs around London with his acoustic guitar, mainly in small pub appearances for almost three years. After a performance at the Finsbury pub, a representative of Insanity Records heard him play and offered a contract.

Career

2016–2018: Beginnings, EPs and debut album
Grennan's debut EP, Something in the Water was produced by Charlie Hugall. He had his big break when he was featured on the Chase & Status 2016 single "All Goes Wrong" that was picked as "Hottest Record" on Annie Mac's Radio 1 show. Following this, he was invited for an appearance on the station's Live Lounge, and a follow up appearance on BBC Two's television programme Later... with Jools Holland. The song appeared on the UK Singles Chart, peaking at number 65.

In February 2017, Grennan was shortlisted for the MTV Brand New Award, also performing at the MTV Showcase at London's Electric Ballroom. The same year, he had a cameo appearance in Charli XCX's music video for her song "Boys", alongside many well-known artists and duetted with grime MC Bugzy Malone on "Memory Lane". Grennan performed in Trafalgar Square during the F1 Live in London show in support of Formula One drivers. In March 2018, he embarked on a UK tour in support of his debut album Lighting Matches, later released in July 2018. His song "Found What I've Been Looking For" appeared on the FIFA 18 soundtrack and was also used by Sky Sports as the theme song for Super Sunday and RBI19 Baseball.

2020–present: Commercial breakthrough, Evering Road and What Ifs & Maybes
In January 2020, Grennan released the first single "This is the Place" from his second album Evering Road. He followed this with two further singles "Oh Please" and "Amen" in the same year. His fourth single from the album "Little Bit of Love" was released in January 2021. It earned Grennan his first top-ten single in the UK, with the song charting at number seven on the UK Singles Chart. The song has been awarded a Platinum certification by the BPI and has surpassed one million UK chart sales, also charting around Europe. Evering Road was later released in March 2021, topping the UK Albums Chart in its opening week and later gaining a Gold certification. He subsequently achieved another top-ten hit with "Let's Go Home Together", a collaboration with Ella Henderson which was also certified Platinum in the UK. This was followed with "By Your Side", a collaboration with Scottish DJ Calvin Harris which earned Grennan his third consecutive UK top-ten single and Platinum certification. He was also featured as a presenter on Radio 1's Future Sounds show for four nights in August and September, becoming one of the five musicians to be featured for the month of August, alongside Olly Alexander, Arlo Parks, Yungblud and Charli XCX.

In February 2022, Grennan received two Brit Awards nominations, including British Song of the Year for "Little Bit of Love" and Best Rock/Alternative Act. In March 2022, Grennan released the first single from his third album "Remind Me", which charted at number 27 on the UK Singles Chart. In April 2022, Grennan was beaten and robbed after a performance in Manhattan. He suffered a ruptured ear and torn ear-drum and postponed an upcoming show in Washington, D.C. In July 2022, he released "All These Nights". In August 2022, Grennan featured on KSI's "Not Over Yet". The collaboration debuted at number one on The Sky VIP Official Big Top 40, and debuted at number four on the UK Singles Chart, becoming Grennan's fourth top-ten hit and his highest charting song to date.

Grennan will release his third album What Ifs & Maybes in the second quarter of 2023, which will be supported by a UK arena tour beginning in March 2023.

Discography

Studio albums
 Lighting Matches (2018)
 Evering Road (2021)
 What Ifs & Maybes (2023)

Awards and nominations

References

External links
Facebook
SoundCloud

1995 births
Living people
English folk guitarists
English male guitarists
English folk singers
English male singer-songwriters
People from Bedford
British people of Irish descent
21st-century English singers
21st-century British guitarists
21st-century British male singers